Vila de Sena or more commonly Sena is a town in Mozambique where there is a fundamental bridge over the Zambezi River.  This bridge, the Dona Ana Bridge was originally a single track railway bridge, temporarily converted to road operation during the civil war.

The town lies on the east bank of the river.

Transport 

The Sena railway has a junction at this station. The railway is not operational; it is in very poor condition, and reconstruction work has been delayed.

In 2008, a factory for making concrete sleepers was established here.

The railway has a siding for passing trains but no junction.  The line is operational with its main use transportation coal to the port of Beira from Moatize in Tete Province. A passenger and general goods train operated by CFM travels three to four times a week from Beira.

See also 
 Railway stations in Mozambique
 Transport in Mozambique

References 

Populated places in Sofala Province